Two Rode Together is a 1961 American Western film directed by John Ford and starring James Stewart, Richard Widmark, and Shirley Jones. The supporting cast includes Linda Cristal, Andy Devine, and John McIntire. The film was based upon the 1959 novel Comanche Captives by Will Cook.

Plot
In 1880s Tascosa, Texas, Marshal Guthrie McCabe is content to be the business and personal partner of attractive saloon owner Belle Aragon, receiving 10% of the profits. When relatives of Comanche captives demand that Army Major Frazer find their lost ones, he uses a combination of army pressure and rewards from the families to get the reluctant McCabe to take on the job of ransoming any he can find. He assigns Lt. Jim Gary, a friend of McCabe's, to accompany him.
 
Marty Purcell is haunted by the memory of her younger brother Steve, abducted nine years earlier, when he was eight and she was 13. She keeps a music box that belonged to him. McCabe warns her that Steve will not remember her because he was a young boy when he was taken. McCabe is also promised a large reward by Harry Wringle, the wealthy stepfather of another boy.

McCabe bargains with Chief Quanah Parker, and finds four white captives. Two refuse to go back with him, one a young woman who is now married with children and the other an old woman, Mrs. Clegg, who regards herself as already dead. He does ransom a teenaged boy named Running Wolf, whom McCabe hopes is the lost son of the wealthy Wringles, and a Mexican woman, Elena de la Madriaga. Elena is the wife of Stone Calf (Woody Strode), a militant rival of Quanah's. The evening the two men leave camp with their "rescued" captives, Stone Calf tries to take back his wife, and is killed by McCabe, much to Quanah's satisfaction.

Running Wolf clearly hates white people, and the rich man refuses to accept him, but a severely traumatized and broken woman is convinced that Running Wolf is her long lost son and claims him. Later, when she tries to cut his hair, he kills her. The settlers decide to lynch the boy, despite Lt. Gary's attempt to stop them. As they drag him away, Running Wolf knocks over Marty's music box. He hears it play and recognizes the melody.  Marty cannot save him and is forced to accept that nothing could have been done to bring back the brother she remembered. She accepts Lt. Gary's proposal of marriage.

Elena finds herself ostracized by white society, deemed a woman who "degraded herself" by submitting to a savage rather than killing herself. Meanwhile,  she and McCabe have fallen in love, exemplified when he gives the soldiers and their wives a dressing down for their treatment of Elena.  Then McCabe discovers that Belle took his simple-minded deputy as a lover, and got him elected to replace McCabe as marshal. After one last humiliation from Belle, Elena decides to go to California, and McCabe happily decides to go with her. As they leave, Lt. Gary tells Belle that his friend "finally found something that he wants more than ten percent of."

Cast

 James Stewart as Marshal Guthrie McCabe
 Richard Widmark as First Lieutenant Jim Gary
 Shirley Jones as Marty Purcell 
 Linda Cristal as Elena de la Madriaga 
 Andy Devine as Sergeant Darius P. Posey 
 John McIntire as Major Frazer 
 Paul Birch as Judge Edward Purcell 
 Willis Bouchey.as Mr. Harry J. Wringle 
 Henry Brandon as Chief Quanah Parker
 Harry Carey Jr. as Ortho Clegg 
 Olive Carey as Mrs. Abby Frazer 
 Ken Curtis as Greeley Clegg 
 Chet Douglas as Deputy Ward Corby 
 Annelle Hayes as Belle Aragon 
 David Kent as Running Wolf (Steve Purcell)
 Anna Lee as Mrs. Malaprop
 Jeanette Nolan as Mrs. Mary McCandless 
 John Qualen as Ole Knudsen 
 Ford Rainey as Reverend Henry Clegg
 Woody Strode as Stone Calf 
 O.Z. Whitehead as Lieutenant Chase
 Ted Knight as Lieutenant Upton

Production

The shoot was far from a happy one. This was not a personal project for Ford, but something he did only for the money ($225,000 plus 25% of the net profits) and as a favor to Columbia Pictures head Harry Cohn, who died in 1958. Ford said he admired Cohn like "a large, brilliant serpent." The director hated the material, believing he had done a far better treatment of the theme in The Searchers (1956). Even after he brought in his most trusted screenwriter, Frank Nugent—the man responsible for The Searchers and nine other Ford classics—to fix the script, the director said it was "still crap."

Nevertheless, he took the project on, and proceeded to take out his frustrations on his cast and crew, not that this was uncharacteristic. Stewart had been warned about the director's behavior by such longtime Ford stalwarts as John Wayne and Henry Fonda—whom Ford had once socked in the jaw, during the filming of Mister Roberts (1955). 

Stewart came to learn Ford liked to keep his actors in the dark about the direction of the picture and suspicious of each other. In Andrew Sinclair's 1979 biography, John Ford, Stewart revealed that Ford's "direction took the form of asides. Sometimes he'd put his hand across his mouth so that others couldn't hear what he was saying to you. On Two Rode Together, he told me to watch out for Dick Widmark because he was a good actor and that he would start stealing if I didn't watch him. Later, I learned he'd told Dick the same thing about me. He liked things to be tense."

One of the film's most renowned and impressive shots has been credited solely to Ford's mean streak. In the famous five-minute, two-shot of Stewart and Widmark bantering on a river bank about money, women, and the Comanche problem, the film's downbeat comedy and careless attitude toward human life are summed up perfectly. Ford justified the take as a simple preference for a wide-screen, two-shot over cross-cutting between close-ups of "pock-marked faces". Stewart and others insisted, though, that Ford forced his crew to wade waist-deep into the icy river and stay there all day until the shot was completed.

The film was shot at the Alamo Village, the movie set originally created for  Wayne's The Alamo (1960).

This film was the 15th that Jack Murray edited for John Ford. It was also the last; Murray died a few months before the film's release.

Relationship between Ford and Stewart
Although the movie was not a commercial success, and Stewart and Ford did not make the best collaborative team, they worked together three more times, two of those in films that took a radically different and even darker view of the Western myth: The Man Who Shot Liberty Valance (1962) and Cheyenne Autumn (1964). They might not have been the best of friends on or off the set, but they had a grudging respect for each other. The closest Ford ever came to praising Stewart was when he said, "He did a whale of a job manufacturing a character the public went for. He studied acting." Stewart wore the same hat in the film that he had worn in all his Westerns with director Anthony Mann, prompting Ford to remark, "Great, now I have actors with hat approval!" Ford refused to allow Stewart to wear any hat in The Man Who Shot Liberty Valance, while John Wayne wore the most flamboyant, wide-brimmed, ten-gallon hat that he had worn in film since the 1930s.

References

External links
 
 
 
 

1961 films
1960s English-language films
1960s buddy films
1960s historical films
1961 Western (genre) films
American buddy films
American historical films
American Western (genre) films
Columbia Pictures films
Films scored by George Duning
Films based on American novels
Films based on Western (genre) novels
Films directed by John Ford
Films set in the 1880s
Films set in Texas
Films shot in Texas
Revisionist Western (genre) films
1960s American films